Tony Schmidt (born 9 May 1980 in Leipzig) is a German racing driver.

Career

Formula Three
Schmidt competed in German Formula Three from 1999 to 2001, establishing himself as a midfield runner. He also scored three podium finishes during these seasons, and competed in the Masters of Formula Three race twice.

Formula 3000
Schmidt competed in three seasons of Formula 3000 from 2002 to 2004, again as a midfield runner. Despite developing into a consistent points scorer, he did not get a drive in the GP2 Series which replaced F3000 for 2005.

Racing record

Complete International Formula 3000 results
(key) (Races in bold indicate pole position; races in italics indicate fastest lap.)

References
 Tony Schmidt career statistics at driverdb.com, retrieved 11 November 2006.

1980 births
Living people
German Formula Three Championship drivers
Italian Formula Three Championship drivers
German racing drivers
German Formula Renault 2.0 drivers
International Formula 3000 drivers
Sportspeople from Leipzig
Racing drivers from Saxony

Team Astromega drivers
Ma-con Motorsport drivers